Goianésia is a municipality in the state of Goiás, Brazil.  It is a large producer of sugarcane for production of alcohol used as a source of fuel.

Location
Goianésia is located almost due north of Anápolis (150 km), 54 km from the Belém-Brasília highway.  Goiânia, the state capital is 182 km away, while Brasília, the national capital is 280 km. away. Highway connections from Goiânia are made by GO-080 / Nerópolis / São Francisco de Goiás / BR-153 / Jaraguá / GO-080.  See Seplan for the complete list.

Municipal boundaries:
Norte: São Luíz do Norte and Santa Rita do Novo Destino
South: Jaraguá and Pirenópolis
East: Santa Isabel
West: Barro Alto and Vila Propício

The municipality contains the sources of the Peixes, Bois, and Patos rivers.  Average annual temperatures range from 22 to 25 degrees Celsius.

Demographic data
Population growth rate 2000/2007: 1.30.%
Urban population in 2007: 40,934   
Rural population in 2007: 3,872

Economy
Agro-industry plays a large role in the economy of the municipality, with importance given to the production of alcohol and sugar.  Two destillaries are located in the town, both processing alcohol and sugar.

Sugar cane is the most important crop of Goianésia, with a planted area of more than 12,000 hectares.  Corn, dry farmed rice, and soybeans are also important crops.  Tomato production has also increased as well as the planting of rubber trees.

Most of the small rural properties have milk as their main source of income, which is used to supply the dairies of the region.  Cattle raising is still important with the municipality having 109,000 head in 2006, of which 25,500 were dairy cattle.

Other activities relevant to the economy are: meat packing, production of feed, mineral salt, gravel, and bricks.

Industrial units: 92 (06/2007)
Retail units: 638 (08/2007)
Banking institutions: 4  (08/2007)
Dairies: 2 (05/2006)
Distilleries: 2 (07/2007)
Meatpacking units: 1 (05/2006)
Industrial Area: Distrito Agroindustrial - DAIAGO (2007)
Automobiles: 5,459 in 2004 (IBGE/Sepin)

In 2006 there were 816 farms employing 1,500 workers.  The total agricultural area was 106,550 ha., of which 12,000 ha. were planted in crops, 73,000 ha. were natural pasture, and 18,000 ha. were forest or woodland.  There were 203 tractors on 131 of the farms.

Education and health
Literacy rate: 86.3%
Infant mortality rate: 25.58 in 1,000 live births
Schools: 51 (2006)
Students: 15,548
Higher education: UEG - Faculdade de Educação, Ciências e Letras de Goianésia, Faculdade Betel de Goianésia - FABEGO.
Hospitals: 05 (2007
Hospital beds: 199 (IBGE/Sepin)
Municipal Human Development Index  0.743
State ranking:  95 (out of 242 municipalities in 2000)
National ranking:  2,064 (out of 5,507 municipalities in 2000)

For the complete list see frigoletto.com.br

Communications
Goianésia has one interstate and intermunicipal bus company which maintains links with Goiânia, Brasília, and other cities in Goiás.  There is a municipal airport with a paved runway of 1,300 meters.

See also
 List of municipalities in Goiás

References

Frigoletto
Highway distances to Goiânia

External links
Goianésia City Council - The Official Website (in Portuguese)
Photo gallery of the city
IBGE - Cidades@ Goianésia
Goianésia in English

Municipalities in Goiás